Antti Elias Rentola (8 February 1881, Vimpeli – 28 July 1919) was a Finnish Lutheran clergyman and politician. He was a member of the Parliament of Finland from 1917 to 1919, representing the Agrarian League.

References

1881 births
1919 deaths
People from Vimpeli
People from Vaasa Province (Grand Duchy of Finland)
20th-century Finnish Lutheran clergy
Centre Party (Finland) politicians
Members of the Parliament of Finland (1917–19)
People of the Finnish Civil War (White side)
University of Helsinki alumni